OceanGate Inc. is a privately held company operating out of Everett, Washington that provides subsea crewed submersible solutions for industry, research and exploration. The company was founded in 2009 by Stockton Rush.

Submersibles

Cyclops (500 meters) 

Launched in March 2015, the Cyclops 1 submersible is the first Cyclops Class submersible developed by OceanGate.

Titan (4000 meters) 
OceanGate worked with engineers from NASA’s Marshall Space Flight Center in Huntsville, Alabama to develop and manufacture Titan, a 5-person vessel made of carbon fiber and titanium.

The use of carbon fiber drastically reduces the overall weight compared to other deep-sea submersibles and the integrated launch and recovery platform increases flexibility during deployment and transportation.

OceanGate’s Titan is the vessel used in the survey expeditions of the RMS Titanic wreckage site. The first expedition took place in 2021.

References

Companies based in Everett, Washington
Business services companies established in 2009
Submarines of the United States
American companies established in 2009
2009 establishments in Washington (state)
Business services companies of the United States